The lira (plural: lire, abbreviation: MAL), officially known as the Military Authority Lira, was the currency of the British zone of occupation (later Mandate Territory) in Libya between 1943 and 1951, and of the province of Tripolitania until early 1952. It was issued by the Military Authority in Tripolitania and circulated together with the Italian lira at par. This situation reflected that of Italy, where the AM-lira was minted by the United States. The Tripolitanian and the Italian lira were replaced in early 1952 by the Libyan pound at a rate of £L1 = 480 MAL.

Paper money

No coins were issued for this currency, with old Italian coins still circulating, although heavily devalued. The 50 centesimo piece for example was worth just a quarter of a penny. Notes were issued in denominations of 1 lira and 2, 5, 10, 50, 100, 500 and 1,000 lire.

References

Modern obsolete currencies
History of Tripolitania
1943 establishments in Libya
1951 disestablishments in Libya
Currencies of Libya
Pound (currency)